Marion Graves Anthon Fish (nickname, "Mamie"; June 8, 1853 – May 25, 1915), often referred to by contemporaries as Mrs. Stuyvesant Fish, was an American socialite and self-styled "fun-maker" of the Gilded Age. She and her husband, Stuyvesant Fish, maintained stately homes in New York City and Newport, Rhode Island.

Early life 
Marion ("Mamie") Graves Anthon, as she was called, was born in Grimes Hill, Staten Island, and was the daughter of Sarah Attwood Meert and the esteemed Gen. William Henry Anthon (1827–1875), a successful lawyer and Staten Island assemblyman.  Her paternal grandfather was the jurist John Anthon (1784–1863).  Mamie was of Dutch, English, French and German ancestry. She grew up on Irving Place in Manhattan and received only a rudimentary education and, by her own admission, could barely read and write.

Society hostess 

Fish ruled as one of the so-called Triumvirate of American Gilded Age society, known as the "Four Hundred", along with Alva Vanderbilt Belmont and Tessie Oelrichs. She became a notable leader of high society (in New York City at her townhouse at 25 East 78th Street, at her stately home Glenclyffe in Philipstown, New York, and at her mansion Crossways in Newport, RI) by virtue of her quick wit and sharp tongue. Grandees attending her dinner parties would be greeted with the occasional insult, "Make yourself perfectly at home, and believe me, there is no one who wishes you there more heartily than I do." One man was greeted with "Oh, how do you do! I had quite forgotten I asked you!"

In collusion with her antics, Harry Lehr often served as a co-planner of outrageous parties. A widely repeated story says that one was given in honor of "Prince Del Drago of Corsica", who turned out to be a well-dressed monkey introduced by Joseph Leiter. Given too much champagne, the monkey proceeded to climb the chandelier and throw light bulbs at the guests. But Lehr "denied that he had ever given such a dinner", although in 1905, it was said to have taken place the year before. At another of her parties, dancers holding peanuts would feed an elephant she rented as they danced by it.

Fish's cattiness respected no rank, for when Theodore Roosevelt's wife sought to keep a frugal household,  Fish was quoted as condescendingly saying of Mrs. Roosevelt "It is said [she] dresses on three hundred dollars a year, and she looks it."

Personal life
On June 1, 1876, she married Stuyvesant Fish (1851–1923), the director of the National Park Bank of New York City and president of the Illinois Central Railroad. He was the son of Hamilton Fish (1808–1893). Together, they had four children, three of whom lived to adulthood:

 Livingston Fish (1879–1880), who died at six months
 Marian Anthon Fish (1880–1944), who married Albert Zabriskie Gray (1881–1964), the son of the Judge John Clinton Gray, on June 12, 1907. They divorced on December 5, 1934.
 Stuyvesant Fish Jr. (1883–1952), who married Isabelle Mildred Dick (1884–1972), daughter of Evans Rogers Dick, in 1910
 Sidney Webster Fish (1885–1950), who married Olga Martha Wiborg (1890–1937), daughter of Frank Bestow Wiborg, in 1915.  In 1939, he married Esther Foss, the daughter of Gov. Eugene Noble Foss. She had previously been married to George Gordon Moore, a polo player whom she divorced in 1933, and Aiden Roark, another polo player whom she married in 1934 and divorced in 1937.

She died on May 25, 1915, and is buried near Glenclyffe at the Church of St. Philip-in-the-Highlands. Her Newport "summer cottage", Crossways, is now a condominium.

In popular culture
In the HBO series, The Gilded Age, Mamie Fish is portrayed by actress Ashlie Atkinson.

References 
Notes

Sources
 "Crossways". The Gilded Age Era. Web. October 27, 2014. http://thegildedageera.blogspot.com/2012/07/crossways-stuyvesant-fish-cottage.html
 Dalton, Kathleen. "Theodore Roosevelt, Knickerbocker Aristocrat" New York History, Vol. 67, No. 1 (JANUARY 1986), 39–65.
 Published by: New York State Historical Association. Web. October 21, 2014. https://www.jstor.org/stable/23178766
 Gavan, Terrence. 'The Barons of Newport: A Guide to the Gilded Age'. Newport: Pineapple Publications, 1998. 
 Marian Graves "Mamie" Anthon Fish. Web. October 21, 2014. https://www.findagrave.com/memorial/46494627
 Mrs. Stuyvesant Fish, née Marion Anthon, a.k.a. Mamie, New York Social Diary. New York Social Diary, 2013. Web. July 28, 2014. http://www.newyorksocialdiary.com/node/1907575
 Notable and Fanciful Quotes: "Magnificent Mamie" Mrs. Stuyvesant Fish. The Esoteric Curiosa: Knowledge Is Power. 2010. Web. October 19, 2014  http://theesotericcuriosa.blogspot.com/2010/07/notable-and-fanciful-quotes-magnificent.html
 Vanderbilt II, Arthur T., Fortune's Children. Morrow: 1989. 

1853 births
1915 deaths
Marion Graves Anthon
American people of Dutch descent
American people of English descent
American people of French-Canadian descent
American people of German descent
American socialites
People from Grymes Hill, Staten Island
Gilded Age
People included in New York Society's Four Hundred
People from Gramercy Park
People from the Upper East Side